The Little Slate River is a river of New Zealand's Tasman Region. As with its neighbour, the Slate River, it is a tributary of the Aorere River. The Little Slate meets the Aorere 15 kilometres southwest of Collingwood.

See also
List of rivers of New Zealand

References

Rivers of the Tasman District
Rivers of New Zealand